Cloud9 Esports, Inc., or simply Cloud9 (C9), is an American professional esports company based in Santa Monica, California. The company was originally founded as a professional League of Legends team by Jack and Paullie Etienne in May 2013 and was incorporated into Cloud9 Esports, Inc. on September 6, 2016. Cloud9 has received million in total raised equity via venture capital funding and was ranked the world's fifth-most valuable esports organization in mid-2022.

Cloud9 has held divisions in numerous esports throughout its existence, establishing eight by 2014. In 2018, Cloud9 won three international championships: the Rocket League Championship Series Season 6 World Championship, the 2018 Overwatch League Grand Finals, and the ELEAGUE Major: Boston 2018. The company currently operates two franchised teams: Cloud9 League of Legends of the League of Legends Championship Series and London Spitfire of the Overwatch League. They also operate non-franchised teams in Apex Legends, Counter-Strike: Global Offensive, Fortnite, Halo, Hearthstone, League of Legends: Wild Rift, Super Smash Bros., Teamfight Tactics, Valorant, and World of Warcraft.

History

2013: Beginnings 
The team that would become Cloud9 originated after esports organization Quantic Gaming released all of their League of Legends players. Afterwards, all five players formed their own team under the moniker Team NomNom, and later rebranded to Cloud9 in early 2013. Cloud9 was then reacquired by Quantic Gaming on April 1, 2013, and later rebranded the team back to Cloud9. The team then changed hands again in May 2013, as former Team SoloMid manager Jack Etienne and Paullie Etienne bought out the contracts of the players for less than $20,000, officially creating the Cloud9 organization. Paullie Etienne was appointed the chief operating officer, and Jack Etienne's father eventually signed on as the organization's first legal counsel.

2013–2018: Expansion and funding 
After early success in the organization's League of Legends division, Cloud9 expanded their brand into other esport games. The organization entered Smite esports in December 2013. In 2014, Cloud9 created divisions for Dota 2, Super Smash Bros. Melee, Hearthstone, Counter-Strike: Global Offensive, Heroes of the Storm, and Halo. The organization disbanded their Smite division the same year  due to internal issues, just prior to the start of the Smite Pro League, but it was reopened in January 2015. Throughout 2015 and 2016, Cloud9 established several more divisions, including  Call of Duty, Overwatch, and their first touchscreen esport Vainglory. On September 6, 2016, the organization incorporated into Cloud9 Esports, Inc.

Although several of their divisions would dissolve, by March 2017, the company had ten teams across multiple titles and over one million fans spending a collective 15million hours following Cloud9 players. That month, Cloud9 received a total of million from series A funding in a round led by Founders Fund, along with other investors Craft Ventures, former Facebook, Inc. executive Chamath Palihapitiya, Reddit Inc. cofounder Alexis Ohanian, and Major League Baseball player Hunter Pence. In July 2017, Cloud9 created their Rocket League division. The following month, Activision Blizzard announced that Cloud9 had purchased a London-based franchise slot for the upcoming Overwatch League (OWL); with the requirement that all organizations in the OWL create separate business entities and branding, Cloud9 created the subsidiary under the name London Spitfire. In November 2017, Riot Games announced that Cloud9 had secured a League of Legends Championship Series franchise slot for a reported million, marking the second owned franchised team by the company.

In June 2018, Cloud9 announced a major sponsorship deal with Red Bull, which included a deal that would place the Red Bull logo on the Cloud9 jerseys. In the middle of that deal, Jack Etienne invited 30 investors to a London Spitfire match at Blizzard Arena; four months later, Cloud9 announced that it had received million in series B funding in a round led by Valor Equity Partners, along with other investors TrueBridge Capital Partners, Reimagined Ventures, and Glassdoor founder Robert Hohman. Additionally, Valor Equity Partners founder and managing partner Antonio Gracias joined Cloud9's board of directors as a part of the deal. Funding from the round was to be used to establish a  headquarters and training facility in Los Angeles, which was expected to be completed by the end of 2019. After the investment, Forbes ranked Cloud9 as the world's most valuable esports company at million.

2018–present: Success, controversy, and league owners 
In 2018, at a time when many esports teams were significantly downscaling their operations and only focusing on a select few games, Cloud9 reached top-level international success in Counter-Strike, Rocket League, Overwatch, and League of Legends. The success of the organization led to Jack Etienne being named Game Shakers' Shaker of the Year in December 2018, an award honoring people who have made a long-lasting impact in the esports industry and helped raise esports awareness around the world. In the following months, Cloud9 entered sponsorship deals with apparel brand Puma, telecommunications company AT&T, and automotive company BMW, in what were all of the companies' first team sponsorships in esports. In that time, Cloud9 has established an Apex Legends division.

In November 2019, Cloud9 was fined by Riot Games for violating League of Legends Championship Series (LCS) rules. Dating back to July 2018, Cloud9 had issued equity to seven of its LCS players through restricted stock units; Riot had created a rule in November 2017 that prohibited any team owner from being on the team's roster. Cloud9 was fined $25,000 for each player violation, totaling $175,000, and had to pay additional money to its players. Riot estimated the total fine to be $330,000 to $605,000. Cloud9 was again ranked by Forbes as the world's most valuable esports company in 2019, along with Team SoloMid; the company was valued at $400million, a $90million increase over the previous year.

In February 2020, it was announced that Cloud9, along with esports organizations Immortals Gaming Club, Dignitas' parent company New Meta Entertainment, Gen.G Esports, c0ntact Gaming, and OverActive Media, had established Counter-Strike: Global Offensive league Flashpoint, the first professional esports league owned and operated by team organizations. The following month, Cloud9 reentered Dota 2 esports after a hiatus of almost three years. Cloud9 created its Valorant division in April 2020, and in October, they created their first all-female esports team for Valorant. Forbes ranked Cloud9 was the world's second-most valuable esports company at $350million in 2020, a 13% decrease from 2019. In May 2022, Forbes ranked them the fifth-most valuable, with a value of $380million.

Divisions

League of Legends

History 
Cloud9 was officially created in 2013 after Jack Etienne purchased the contracts of all of Quantic Gaming's League of Legends players.

With a starting roster of Balls, Meteos, Hai, Sneaky, and LemonNation, Cloud9 went on a 13-game winning streak in the 2013 NA LCS Summer Split regular season, marking the longest winning streak in LCS history at the time. After claiming the top seed in the Summer Split Playoffs, the team went on to sweep the defending champions Team SoloMid, 3 games to 0, in the finals on September 1 to claim their first-ever LCS title. With the win, Cloud9 finished the season with a 30–3 game record and the highest winning-percentage in LCS history at 90.9%. In the 2014 NA LCS Spring Split, Cloud9 closed out the final five weeks on a 13-game winning streak, equaling their LCS record 13-game winning streak in 2013, and once again claimed the top seed in the playoffs. Cloud9 won their second consecutive LCS title after a 3–0 sweep over Team SoloMid in the finals on April 20. After going 5–0 in the playoffs, Cloud9 extended their record winning streak to 18 games and had gone undefeated in back-to-back playoffs. Cloud9 made it to the LCS finals in the 2014 NA LCS Summer Split and 2015 NA LCS Spring Split, but fell to Team SoloMid each time. In May 2015, Hai retired, ending Cloud9's nearly 750-day record of having the longest standing lineup in professional League of Legends history.

The team finished 2015 NA LCS Summer Split with a 6–12 record, their lowest regular season finish ever, and missed the LCS playoffs for the first time in their organization's history. In the 2016 NA LCS Spring Split, the team faced Team SoloMid in the quarterfinals but fell by a score of 1–3. In the quarterfinals match of the 2016 NA LCS Summer Split against Team EnVyUs, Cloud9's Jensen set an LCS record 20 kills in a single game. The team later fell to Team SoloMid in the finals. In the 2017 NA LCS Spring Split, for the sixth, and second consecutive, time, Cloud9 faced Team SoloMid in the NA LCS finals, but the team fell, 2–3. Cloud9 lost to Team Dignitas in the quarterfinals of the 2017 NA LCS Summer Split. In the 2018 NA LCS Spring Split playoffs, Cloud9 was swept by Team Liquid in the quarterfinals by a score of 0–3. The team again reached the finals in the 2018 NA LCS Summer Split, but they were swept by Team Liquid, 0–3.

After the 2018 NA LCS season, Cloud9 had their most successful League of Legends World Championship run. After advancing past the 2018 League of Legends World Championship group stage, Cloud9 swept Korea's Afreeca Freecs, 3–0, in the quarterfinals; The win marked the first time in seven years that a North American team had qualified for the World Championship semifinals. In the semifinals match. Cloud9 was swept by Fnatic, 0–3, ending their World Championship run.

In the 2019 LCS Spring Split, Cloud9 fell to Team SoloMid in the semifinals. After reaching the finals in the 2019 LCS Summer Split, the team fell to Team Liquid, 2–3. In the 2020 LCS Spring Split, Cloud9 finished the regular season with a 17–1 record – tied for the best game record in LCS history. The team secured their third LCS title on April 19, 2020, after they swept FlyQuest, 3–0, in the finals. The win gave the team their first LCS title since 2014; with an overall 26–2 game win–loss record, including playoffs, Cloud9 set a LCS record for the highest winning percentage ever in a single split by a North American team at 92.9%, breaking their own previous record of 90.9% from the 2013 Summer Split. Losses to Flyquest and Team SoloMid in the Summer Split playoffs not only eliminated the team from the LCS playoffs, but also eliminated Cloud9's ability to qualify for the 2020 World Championship, marking the first time in the organization's history that they would not attend the World Championship.

On September 14, 2020, Cloud9 parted ways with head coach Bok "Reapered" Hangyu, who had been the head coach of the team for the past four years. The organization promoted Cloud9's academy team coach Kim "Reignover" Yeu-jin as their new head coach.

In the 2021 LCS season, Cloud9 entered the Spring Split playoffs as the top seed, with a 13–5 record. C9 defeated Team Liquid in the finals, 3–2, and earned their 4th LCS title. At the 2021 Mid-Season Invitational, they failed to advance to the knockout stage. In the Summer playoffs, Cloud9 defeated Team SoloMid 3–2 to claim a spot at the 2021 League of Legends World Championship; however, they lost their next match to 100 Thieves. At Worlds, Cloud9 advanced to the quarterfinals, becoming the first North American team to make it past the group stage since the previous Cloud9 team reached semifinals in 2018. They lost in the quarterfinals to Gen.G, 0–3.

Roster

Hearthstone 
On June 26, 2014, Cloud9 announced the formation of their Hearthstone division after acquiring team DogeHouse. Joining the team was the players Marcin "Gnimsh" Filipowicz, Cong "StrifeCro" Shu, Rumay "Hafu" Wang, Alexandr "Kolento" Malsh, and Jan "Ekop" Palys, with Gnimsh appointed as the team's captain. Additionally, the team picked up Andrew "TidesofTime" Biessener later that year. Kolento won the team's first major tournament after winning the Viagame House Cup #1 in October 2014; the following month, he won the DreamHack Hearthstone Championship.  Kolento won the teams only major tournament in 2015 after winning CN vs EU Season 2 in March. The team picked up former Team SoloMid player Harry "Massan" Cheong in June 2015. In November 2015, Cloud9 parted ways with Hafu, TidesofTime, and Gnimsh. Cloud9 signed former team Archon player James "Firebat" Kostesich in March 2016. After being banned from Twitch in May 2016, Cloud9 parted ways with Massan. Several days later, the team signed Sanghyeon "DDaHyoNi" Baek. In May 2016, StrifeCro took home the OGN Hearthstone Seoul Cup World Invitational. Later that month, Cloud9 parted ways with Ekop. In March 2017, Firebat left the team. StrifeCro left the team in May 2017. In December 2018, Cloud9 signed Cho "Flurry" Hyun-soo, Kim "LookSam" Jin-hyo, and Jang "DawN" Hyun-jae. In March 2019, Kolento won StarLadder Hearthstone Ultimate Series Winter. The team signed Lee "Portia" Dongjae in August 2020.

Roster

Super Smash Bros. 

Cloud9 joined the Super Smash Bros. scene after picking up Evo 2013 champion Joseph "Mango" Manuel Marquez for Super Smash Bros. Melee (Melee) in May 2014 and is currently the longest tenured player at Cloud9. Mango's first tournament under Cloud9 was Get On My Level 2014 in Toronto, where he took first place. In June 2014, Mango finished in first and second at MLG Anaheim 2014 and CEO 2014, respectively, meeting Armada both times in the Grand Finals. The following month, Mango took home his second consecutive Evolution Championship Series (Evo) title after defeating Hungrybox in the Grand Finals of EVO 2014. In October 2014, Mango won The Big House 4 after defeating Mew2King in Grand Finals. In 2015, Mango finished in fourth place at Apex 2015 and third place at CEO 2015. At Evo 2015, Mango fell to Hungrybox in the lower bracket semifinals. At The Big House 5, Mango finished in fourth place after losing to Mew2King. Mango's first tournament of 2016 was at GENESIS 3 in January, where he fell to Armada in the grand finals. The following month, Mango finished in second place at PAX Arena after losing to Hungrybox in the finals. He secured his first major tournament championship of 2016 in May after defeating Hungrybox in the finals at DreamHack Austin. The same month, he finished second at Get On My Level 2016 after falling to Leffen in the finals. In July 2016, Mango finished in fourth place at Evo 2016 after falling to Hungrybox in the lower bracket semifinals. The following month, he took first place at Super Smash Con 2016 after taking down Hungrybox in the finals.

In August 2016, the organization added their second Super Smash Bros. player with the addition of Evo 2016 champion Elliot "Ally" Bastien Carroza-Oyarce for Super Smash Bros. for Wii U (Smash 4). Mango and Ally both attended The Big House 6 in October 2016. Ally, citing health concerns, dropped out of the Smash 4 tournament after falling to the lower bracket. Mango took home his second The Big House title under Cloud9 after defeating Armada in the Melee finals. At the end of 2016, Cloud9 signed Daniel "Tafokints" Lee as Mango's coach.

Ally and Mango competed in GENESIS 4 in January 2017. Both Cloud9 members took second place in their respective tournaments, with Ally falling to MKLeo in the Smash 4 finals and Mango falling to Armada in the Melee finals. At EVO 2017, Ally failed to defend his Smash 4 EVO title from 2016, finishing outside the top 32. In the Melee tournament, Mango reached the grand finals, but he fell to Armada in the finals match to finish in second place. The following month, Mango defended his Super Smash Con title after winning Super Smash Con 2017. The two competed at The Big House 7 in October 2017. Ally finished the Smash 4 tournament in the top eight, while Mango finished in the top six of the Melee tournament. In January 2018, Ally and Mango competed at GENESIS 5, with Ally finishing in ninth place and Mango finishing in fifth.

On March 31, 2018, Mango's coach Tafokints announced he was departing the organization to join Counter Logic Gaming as their business development manager. Five days later, Cloud9 parted ways with Ally.

At Evo 2018, Mango finished in the top eight. Mango competed in his first Super Smash Bros. Ultimate tournament in June 2018 and finished in the top four. For the remainder of 2018, Mango failed to win a tournament but was able to finish in the top three of five tournaments, including Shine 2018, The Big House 8, and Smash Summit 7. In May 2019, Mango won Get On My Level 2019, ending his 19-event, and nearly two-year, streak without winning a tournament. He went on to win his second Melee major of the year in October after defeating Zain in The Big House 9 grand finals. Mango started 2020 with a third-place finish at GENESIS 7. In July 2020, he finished in second place at the Ludwig Ahgren Championship Series 2 after falling to Zain in the grand finals. In November, Mango was the runner-up at Smash Summit 10. Mango finished 2020 with a win at the Ludwig Ahgren Championship Series 3 after defeating iBDW in the finals.

Roster

Counter-Strike: Global Offensive 
Cloud9 entered the professional Counter-Strike: Global Offensive scene on August 1, 2014, with the acquisition of compLexity Gaming's North American roster. The players reportedly left compLexity after they received better offers from Cloud9 prior to renewing their contracts. Cloud9 made their first appearance at ESL One: Cologne 2014, where they finished 2–0 in Group D of the group stage but lost in the quarterfinals to Swedish team Ninjas in Pyjamas, who later won the tournament. On November 26, Sean "sgares" Gares replaced Spencer "Hiko" Martin as the team's in-game leader. On December 14, Hiko left Cloud9, to be replaced by Shahzeb "ShahZaM" Khan.

On April 24, 2015, Cloud9 released ShahZam and Kory "Semphis" Friesen. Five days later, Ryan "fREAKAZOiD" Abadir and Tyler "Skadoodle" Latham, formerly of iBUYPOWER, joined the team, and Braxton "swag" Pierce joined as an analyst, sgares stepped down from the roster on November 24.

Cloud9 placed thirteenth to sixteenth at MLG Columbus 2016, losing to Natus Vincere and G2 Esports in the group stage. Shortly after the event on April 12, it was announced that fREAKAZOiD would be leaving the team. Team Liquid's Eric "adreN" Hoag was subsequently announced as a temporary stand-in, playing for Cloud9 until Alec "Slemmy" White was announced as the official replacement on April 23. Manager Tres "stunna" Saranthus left the team on July 26. On August 17, Cloud9 announced that they were replacing Slemmy with Timothy "autimatic" Ta. On October 30, Cloud9 defeated SK Gaming 2–1 in a best-of-three series to win the ESL Pro League Season 4 finals in São Paulo, Brazil.

On August 15, 2017, Michael "shroud" Grzesiek and Jordan "n0thing" Gilbert left the team, with shroud announcing that he intended to become a full-time streamer.

On January 28, 2018, Cloud9 defeated FaZe Clan 2–1 at the ELEAGUE Major: Boston 2018 finals, becoming the first North American team to win a Major. On March 31, Cloud9's main AWPer, Tyler "Skadoodle" Latham, announced on Twitter that he was taking a break from professional play. On the same day, a much anticipated transfer occurred with Jacky "Stewie2K" Yip terminating his multi-year contract with Cloud9 to move to SK Gaming, although he would later join Team Liquid after only a brief stay with SK. shroud officially retired from competitive play and left Cloud9 on April 18.

Cloud9 announced on December 6, 2019, that Timothy "autimatic" Ta, Damian "daps" Steele, and Kenneth "koosta" Suen had been released from the organization and their contracts bought out by Gen.G Esports. A month later, on January 6, 2020, Cloud9 signed the South African team ATK's CS:GO roster.

On September 6, 2020, Cloud9 announced that they would undergo a complete rebuild in their CS:GO division. The players continued to play under the Cloud9 name until the new roster was completely formed. The next day, Cloud9 unveiled their new general manager  Henry "⁠HenryG⁠" Greer and new coach  Aleksandar "⁠kassad⁠" Trifunović. On September 10, Alex "⁠ALEX⁠" McMeekin signed a three-year contract with Cloud9. On September 19, Cloud9 acquired William "⁠mezii⁠" Merriman from GamerLegion and Özgür "⁠woxic⁠" Eker from mousesports. On October 7, Cloud9 re-signed Ricky "⁠floppy⁠" Kemery, who becomes the fourth player of the new team. The last player Patrick "es3tag" Hansen was bought from Astralis and was announced on October 15. On December 28, Aleksandar "⁠kassad⁠" Trifunović was released by Cloud9. On January 18, 2021, Özgür "⁠woxic⁠" Eker was released by Cloud9 following poor results as a team. On January 22, Erick "Xeppaa" Bach was announced as woxic's replacement on the team. On January 24, the return of Chris “Elmapuddy” Tebbit as new Head Coach was announced, along with the promotion of m1cks from analyst to the Assistant Coach position Cloud9 disbanded their CS:GO division in March 2021, citing difficulties due to the COVID-19 pandemic.

On April 24, 2022, Cloud9 returned to the CS:GO scene, this time in Europe, acquiring the roster of Gambit Esports.

Cloud9 won IEM Dallas on June 6, 2022, after defeating ENCE 3:0. Cloud9 won a grand prize of US$100,000.

Overwatch

History

Pre-Overwatch League 
Cloud9 formed its Overwatch division in March 2016 after signing team "google me". The team won several LAN events in April and May, such as the One Nation of Gamers Overwatch Invitational, Overkill, and the Alienware Monthly Melee. Their first major tournament post-release of Overwatch was the Agents Rising tournament, which they won after defeating Team Liquid in the finals.

Following Agents Rising, they finished second in both the June Alienware Monthly and Operation Breakout tournaments; both times they fell to Team EnVyUs in the finals. Later that month, Cloud9 finished in fourth place at the OG Invitational tournament after losing to Northern Gaming in the third place match. After several wins in smaller weekly and qualifier tournaments, the team9 qualified for the Beyond the Summit (BTS) Overwatch Cup, Overwatch Open, and 2016 ESL Overwatch Atlantic Showdown. The team finished in second place at BTS after losing to Team EnVyUs in the finals, fell to Team EnVyUs in the group stage semifinals at the Overwatch Open, and did not make it past the group stage at the Atlantic Showdown. Cloud9 was one of four western teams invited to compete in South Korea's OGN Overwatch APEX Season 2, which began in January 2017. After falling to South Korean team KongDoo Uncia on February 28 in the group stage, Cloud9 was eliminated from the tournament.

Cloud9 failed to qualify for Overwatch Contenders North America season one; afterwards, the company acquired the former Laser Kittenz roster and established their European team Cloud9 EU for season one of Overwatch Contenders Europe. The following month, in September 2017, Cloud9 established their third Overwatch team after acquiring South Korean team KongDoo Panthera and competed under the moniker Cloud9 KongDoo. Cloud9 EU made it to the playoffs in Contenders Europe season one, but they fell to Misfits Gaming semifinals on October 7. Meanwhile, Cloud9 KongDoo had been competing in OGN Overwatch APEX Season 4, where they ended up taking third place after defeating NC Foxes on October 17.

London Spitfire 

On August 10, 2017, Activision Blizzard announced that Cloud9 had purchased a London-based franchise slot for the upcoming Overwatch League (OWL) for a reported million (million); with the requirement that all organizations in the OWL create separate business entities and branding, Cloud9 created the subsidiary under the name London Spitfire. On November 9, they disclosed their 12-player inaugural season roster, the maximum permitted, which was an amalgamation of their Cloud9 KongDoo team and OGN Overwatch APEX Season 4 champions GC Busan. On February 15, 2018, the Spitfire's European Overwatch Contenders team was announced as the British Hurricane.

In the 2018 season, the Spitfire became the first-ever stage playoffs champions after defeating the New York Excelsior in the 2018 Stage 1 playoffs. In March, London parted ways with head coach Lee "Bishop" Beom-joon for undisclosed reasons. The team qualified for the Stage 2 playoffs, but they fell to the Philadelphia Fusion in the semifinals. London failed to reach the Stage 3 and Stage 4 playoffs and finished the regular season with a  record and the fifth seed in the 2018 Overwatch League playoffs. London defeated the Los Angeles Gladiators in the quarterfinals by a series score of 2–1 to advance to the semifinals. London won both games against the Los Angeles Valiant in the semifinals, advancing them to the 2018 Overwatch League Grand Finals. London faced the Philadelphia Fusion in the Grand Finals on July 27 and 28; in the best-of-three series, the Spitfire won the first two matches by scores of 3–1 and 3–0 to claim the inaugural Overwatch League title.

London began their 2019 season failing to qualify for the Stage 1 playoffs. The team qualified for the Stage 2 playoffs; however, they were knocked out in the quarterfinals by the Hangzhou Spark. The Spitfire parted ways with head coach Kwang-bok "Coach815" Kim in the middle of Stage 3, leaving the team without a head coach. London failed to qualify for the Stage 3 playoffs and finished the regular season with a 16–12 record, qualifying them for the 2019 Play-In Tournament for a chance to qualify for the 2019 season playoffs. London defeated the Shanghai Dragons, 4–3, in the Play-In Tournament in an OWL record eight-map series and qualified for the season playoffs. In the first round, London was defeated by the New York Excelsior, 1–4, sending the team to the lower bracket. A 0–4 loss to the San Francisco Shock the following match ended the Spitfire's 2019 playoff run.

Roster

Fortnite 
Cloud9 first entered Fortnite competitively in 2018, and formally re-entered the circuit in the summer of 2019. The team is currently managed by Krissi Waters.

Roster

Valorant

Blue 
Cloud9 announced its entry into Valorant on April 12, 2020, by signing its first player, Tyson "TenZ" Ngo. Later Cloud9 would sign Skyler "Relyks" Weaver in June, Mitch "mitch" Semago and Josh "shinobi" Abastado in July, and the final member Daniel "vice" Kim in August

On January 12, 2021, TenZ, stepped down from the competitive scene to pursue content creation (while remaining as part of Cloud9). 
In the same month Cloud9 Blue sign players Nathan "leaf" Orf from Chaos Esports Club's CS:GO Division and Son "xeta" Seon-ho from their former Korean team "Cloud9 Korea" as well as signing head coach Yoon "Autumn" Eu-teum and Manager Robin Lee On February 5, 2021, Michael "poiz" Possis joins as the 6th player of the team. On March 11, 2021, TenZ is loaned to Sentinels for Masters Stage 1 in replacement of suspended player, Sinatraa. On March 16, 2021, Daniel "vice" Kim parts ways with the team. On April 16, 2021, Skyler "Relyks" Weaver parts ways with the team. On April 19, 2021, Cloud9 transfers Ricky "floppy" Kemery and Erick "Xeppaa" Bach from their CS:GO division. On June 1, 2021, TenZ, who was previously on loan from Cloud9 Blue, is acquired by Sentinels. On March 13, 2021, Cloud9 Blue acquire Anthony "vanity" Malaspina from Version1. On September 10, 2021, floppy, parts ways with the team. On October 19, 2021, poiz is transferred to their Academy team. After failing to qualify for Masters Reykjavík in stage 2 and Masters Berlin in stage 3 they would qualify for the 2021 Valorant Champions in the North American Last Chance Qualifier beating Rise 3–0. At the Valorant Champions 2021 they would be put into Group D with FNATIC, Vision Strikers and FULL SENSE, they would make it out of the group stage 2-1 before losing to Team Liquid in the quarterfinals.

On May 15, 2022, Cloud9 traded xeta and Autumn to T1 for Rahul "curry" Nemani. Later on May 26, Cloud9 would sign assistant coach Joshua "m1cks" Micks.

Roster

White 
In October 2020, Cloud9 signed orgless all-female team "MAJKL" to compete in First Strike under Cloud9 White. (with the all-male team rebranding to “Cloud9 Blue"). In November 2020, Dream joins as a head coach and MoonChopper as a strategic coach of Cloud9 White. Later in the month Cloud9 White would fail to quality for First Strike: North America.

In January and February 2021, Cloud9 White would fail to qualify for the VCT 2021: North America Stage 1 Challengers 1, 2 and 3 Main Events. On March 12, 2021, Kaitlin "Keiti" Boop joins after being on trial. Later in March, Cloud9 White would qualify for the VCT 2021: Game Changers North America Series 1 in the first seed and later winning the tournament without losing a single map, a week later they would fail to qualify for VCT 2021: North America Stage 2 Challengers 1 Main Event. On April 13, Cloud9 White would release Keiti. In June, Cloud9 White would qualify for and win VCT 2021: Game Changers NA Series 2. The next month, Cloud9 White would fail to qualify for the VCT 2021: North America Stage 3: Challengers 1 and 2 Main Events before qualifying and winning VCT 2021: Game Changers North America Series 3. It was later announced head coach Dream and Cloud9 parted ways a week prior to Series 3 qualifiers.

In February 2022, Cloud9 White would fail to qualify for VCT 2022: North America Stage 1: Challengers 1 Main Event but would go on to qualify and win VCT 2022: Game Changers North American Series 1. In June, Cloud9 would sign Reid "x0tek" Johnson as the new head coach while Annie would leave the team to pursue streaming, with Bob "Bob" Tran replacing her.

Roster

Former divisions

Rocket League 

Cloud9 created their Rocket League division in July 2017 after acquiring DreamHack Atlanta champions team The Muffin Men. With a roster consisting of players Kyle "Torment" Storer, Mariano "SquishyMuffinz" Arruda, and Jesus "Gimmick" Parra, the team began play in the North America Rocket League Championship Series (RLCS) Season 4. After winning the North America playoffs, the team qualified for the RLCS World Championship tournament, where they eventually was eliminated by Scottish team Method in the lower bracket finals. Cloud9 made it to the RLCS Season 5 World Championship tournament but were eliminated by eventual champions Team Dignitas.

In Season 6, Cloud9 qualified for their third consecutive RLCS World Championship tournament. The team lost their first match of the tournament to We Dem Girlz, dropping them to the lower bracket of the tournament. Cloud9 won five consecutive elimination matches in the lower bracket and advanced to the Grand Finals, where they faced undefeated European team Team Dignitas on November 11, 2018. Cloud9 took down the defending champions by a series score of 4–1, marking the first time that a North American team had won the RLCS World Championship since Season 1.

Cloud9 followed up their Season 6 run with a semifinals loss in the Season 7 RLCS World Championship. Between seasons, Cloud signed former NRG Esports player Jayson "Fireburner" Nunez as the team's coach. Cloud9 finished North America RLCS Season 8 in seventh place, which put them at risk of being relegated to the Rocket League Rival Series, a lower division for the RLCS. The team made it through the promotion playoffs to avoid relegation and participate in North America RLCS Season 9, but they did not perform well. On June 10, 2020, Cloud9 disbanded their Rocket League division.

Vainglory 
On September 1, 2016, Cloud9 acquired Nemesis Hydra from Team Nemesis, getting their feet into the mobile esports scene. Nemesis Hydra had been one of the first competitive teams of Vainglory, having first appeared in March 2015. In their short year and a half of existence, Hydra had made it to the third tournament day, at least semi-finals, in each live championship. While never winning a championship, they completed a 14-game win streak in Split One of the 2016 Summer Season tournament "Evil 8."

In the Vainglory Summer Live Championships, under the blue and white of Cloud9, the team beat Phoenix Reborn in the first round, falling to Team SoloMid in the second round, and Phoenix Reign in the loser's bracket, missing their first day three of live finals in their history. Cloud9 would not qualify for the 2016 Vainglory World Championship. The team overcame Team SoloMid in the semifinals of the First Vainglory Unified Championship in London and were crowned winners after taking down Gankstars in Finals. In the 2017 Summer Unified Championships in Los Angeles they would once again be crowned Unified Champions, defeating Immortals in the final. At the 2017 World Championship, Cloud9 would make it all the way to the semifinal, before losing to Tribe Gaming, the former roster of Immortals.

On February 5, 2018, Cloud9 disbanded their Vainglory division.

Tom Clancy's Rainbow Six Siege 
Cloud9 announced that they were adding Rainbow Six Siege to their competitive roster on Twitter on June 18, 2018. However, the team that was originally put together by Cloud9 was eventually moved to Team Reciprocity, announced by Team Reciprocity on January 7, 2019. Cloud9 announced that it was re-entering the Rainbow Six Siege competitive circuit on April 6, 2019, with a new team of five players, one coach, and one assistant coach. They have since changed their roster of players to swap two of their players for the upcoming season. On August 15, 2021, Cloud9 announced that the organization would part ways with their Rainbow Six roster.

References

External links 

 
 

2012 establishments in California
Counter-Strike teams
Halo (franchise) teams
Heroes of the Storm teams
League of Legends Championship Series teams
Super Smash Bros. player sponsors
World of Warcraft teams
Overwatch teams
Vainglory (video game) teams
 
Hearthstone teams
Rocket League teams
Esports teams based in Los Angeles
Defunct and inactive Dota teams
Defunct and inactive Tom Clancy's Rainbow Six Siege teams
London Spitfire
Esports teams established in 2012
Valorant teams
Apex Legends teams
The Game Awards winners
American Internet groups